The Supreme National Tribunal was a war-crime tribunal active in communist-era Poland from 1946 to 1948. Its aims and purpose were defined by the State National Council in decrees of 22 January and 17 October 1946 and 11 April 1947. The new law was based on an earlier decree of 31 August 1944 issued by the new Soviet-imposed Polish regime, with jurisdiction over "fascist-Hitlerite criminals and traitors to the Polish nation". The Tribunal presided over seven high-profile cases involving a total of 49 individuals.

Background

Nazi Germany occupied Poland in 1939 and carried out many atrocities. The 1943 Moscow Declaration stated that Germans judged guilty of war crimes would be sent back to the countries where they had committed their crimes and "judged on the spot by the peoples whom they have outraged." Poland, which suffered heavily due to Nazi atrocities, identified over 12,000 criminals it requested to be extradited; eventually about 2,000 German criminals were extradited to Poland (from 1945 onwards, most before 1949).

The Polish Underground State had its own Special Courts in occupied Poland, which tried and passed sentences on some German war criminals. Communist Polish authorities (of the Polish Committee of National Liberation, PKWN) who did not recognize the Underground State (and in some cases actively persecuted people connected with it) established its own alternative structure, which with the victory of the communist authorities over the Underground State became dominant in post-war Poland. PKWN authorities authorized the establishment of the Special Criminal Courts on 12 September 1944 to try German war criminals. On 22 January 1946, the single-instance Supreme National Tribunal was formed, with a mission to try the main perpetrators of crimes committed by the Third Reich in the occupied Polish territories.

Jurisdiction and powers
The jurisdiction and powers of the Tribunal were defined in decrees of 22 January and 17 October 1946 and a decree of 11 April 1947. The law applied was a decree of 31 August 1944 "concerning the punishment of fascist-Hitlerite criminals guilty of murder and ill-treatment of civilian population and of prisoners of war, and the punishment of traitors to the Polish Nation."

There was no appeal from the Tribunal's verdicts.

Composition of the tribunal
The tribunal had three judges, four members of the jury, procurators and defenders.

The best known judge was Emil Stanisław Rappaport.

Trials

Seven trials were brought before the Supreme National Tribunal in 1946–1948:
 The trial of Arthur Greiser, head of the Free City of Danzig and later, governor of Reichsgau Wartheland
 Trial took place in Poznań, from 22 June to 7 July 1946.
 Sentence: Death, executed
 The trial of Amon Göth, commander of the Kraków-Płaszów concentration camp
 Trial took place in Kraków, from 27 August to 5 September 1946.
 Sentence: Death, executed
 The trial of Ludwig Fischer, Ludwig Leist, Josef Meisinger, Max Daume, all four high-ranking Nazi officials of occupied Warsaw
 Trial took place in Warsaw from 17 December 1946 to 24 February 1947
 Sentences: Fischer, Meisinger, Daume — Death, executed, Leist — 8 years, sentences carried out.
 The trial of Rudolf Höss, one of the commanders of the Auschwitz concentration camp
 Trial took place in Warsaw from 11 March to 29 March 1947
 Sentence: Death, executed
 The trial of 40 staff of the Auschwitz concentration camp (including one of the commanders, Arthur Liebehenschel).
 Trial (also known as the First Auschwitz Trial, with the Frankfurt Auschwitz Trials known as the Second Auschwitz Trial) took place in Kraków from 24 November to 16 December 1947
 Sentences: 23 death sentences (21 executed), 16 imprisonments from life sentences to 3 years of imprisonment, one person (Hans Münch) acquitted for humane behavior and enabling the survival of numerous patients.
 The trial of Albert Forster, governor of Reichsgau Danzig-West Prussia
 Trial took place in Gdańsk from 5 April – 29 April 1948
 Sentence: Death, executed
 The trial of Josef Bühler, state secretary and deputy governor to the General Government
 Trial took place in Kraków from 17 June – 5 July 1948
 Sentence: Death, executed

The first two of the above trials (of Greiser and Göth) were completed before the sentence was passed by the International Military Tribunal in Nuremberg on 30 September 1946.

The Tribunal also declared that the General Government was a criminal institution.

See also
Institute of National Remembrance

References

Further reading
Tadeusz Cyprian, Jerzy Sawicki, Siedem procesów przed Najwyższym Trybunałem Narodowym, Poznań 1962
Various authors. W czterdziestolecie powołania Najwyższego Trybunału Narodowego. Materiały posiedzenia naukowego 20 I 1986 (Forty years after the foundation of the Highest National Tribunal. Papers of a scientific session on Jan 20th 1986), Główna Komisja Badania Zbrodni Hitlerowskich w Polsce, Warszawa 1986
David M. Crowe, The Holocaust: Roots, History, and Aftermath,  Westview Press, 2008, Google Print, pp. 423–425
 Mark A. Drumbl: Germans are the Lords and Poles are the Servants. The Trial of Arthur Greiser in Poland, 1946. In: Kevin Jon Heller, Gerry J. Simpson (Hrsg.): The Hidden Histories of War Crimes Trials. Oxford University Press 2013, .
 Andrzej Rzepliński: Prosecution of Nazi Crimes in Poland in 1939-2004. (PDF) March 2004

External links 
 "Chronicles of Terror" testimony database - materials used by Supreme National Tribunal in trials from 1946-1948

1946 establishments in Poland
1948 disestablishments in Poland
Trials in Poland
World War II war crimes trials